

From 1 to 999 

 1 Ceres
 2 Pallas
 3 Juno
 4 Vesta
 5 Astraea
 6 Hebe
 7 Iris
 8 Flora
 9 Metis
 10 Hygiea
 11 Parthenope
 12 Victoria
 13 Egeria
 14 Irene
 15 Eunomia
 16 Psyche
 17 Thetis
 18 Melpomene
 19 Fortuna
 20 Massalia
 21 Lutetia
 22 Kalliope
 23 Thalia
 24 Themis
 25 Phocaea
 26 Proserpina
 27 Euterpe
 28 Bellona
 29 Amphitrite
 30 Urania
 31 Euphrosyne
 32 Pomona
 33 Polyhymnia
 34 Circe
 35 Leukothea
 36 Atalante
 37 Fides
 38 Leda
 39 Laetitia
 40 Harmonia
 41 Daphne
 42 Isis
 43 Ariadne
 44 Nysa
 45 Eugenia
 46 Hestia
 47 Aglaja
 48 Doris
 49 Pales
 50 Virginia
 51 Nemausa
 52 Europa
 53 Kalypso
 54 Alexandra
 55 Pandora
 56 Melete
 57 Mnemosyne
 58 Concordia
 59 Elpis
 60 Echo
 61 Danaë
 62 Erato
 63 Ausonia
 64 Angelina
 65 Cybele
 66 Maja
 67 Asia
 68 Leto
 69 Hesperia
 70 Panopaea
 71 Niobe
 72 Feronia
 73 Klytia
 74 Galatea
 75 Eurydike
 76 Freia
 77 Frigga
 78 Diana
 79 Eurynome
 80 Sappho
 81 Terpsichore
 82 Alkmene
 83 Beatrix
 84 Klio
 85 Io
 86 Semele
 87 Sylvia
 88 Thisbe
 89 Julia
 90 Antiope
 91 Aegina
 92 Undina
 93 Minerva
 94 Aurora
 95 Arethusa
 96 Aegle
 97 Klotho
 98 Ianthe
 99 Dike
 100 Hekate
 101 Helena
 102 Miriam
 103 Hera
 104 Klymene
 105 Artemis
 106 Dione
 107 Camilla
 108 Hecuba
 109 Felicitas
 110 Lydia
 111 Ate
 112 Iphigenia
 113 Amalthea
 114 Kassandra
 115 Thyra
 116 Sirona
 117 Lomia
 118 Peitho
 119 Althaea
 120 Lachesis
 121 Hermione
 122 Gerda
 123 Brunhild
 124 Alkeste
 125 Liberatrix
 126 Velleda
 127 Johanna
 128 Nemesis
 129 Antigone
 130 Elektra
 131 Vala
 132 Aethra
 133 Cyrene
 134 Sophrosyne
 135 Hertha
 136 Austria
 137 Meliboea
 138 Tolosa
 139 Juewa
 140 Siwa
 141 Lumen
 142 Polana
 143 Adria
 144 Vibilia
 145 Adeona
 146 Lucina
 147 Protogeneia
 148 Gallia
 149 Medusa
 150 Nuwa
 151 Abundantia
 152 Atala
 153 Hilda
 154 Bertha
 155 Scylla
 156 Xanthippe
 157 Dejanira
 158 Koronis
 159 Aemilia
 160 Una
 161 Athor
 162 Laurentia
 163 Erigone
 164 Eva
 165 Loreley
 166 Rhodope
 167 Urda
 168 Sibylla
 169 Zelia
 170 Maria
 171 Ophelia
 172 Baucis
 173 Ino
 174 Phaedra
 175 Andromache
 176 Iduna
 177 Irma
 178 Belisana
 179 Klytaemnestra
 180 Garumna
 181 Eucharis
 182 Elsa
 183 Istria
 184 Dejopeja
 185 Eunike
 186 Celuta
 187 Lamberta
 188 Menippe
 189 Phthia
 190 Ismene
 191 Kolga
 192 Nausikaa
 193 Ambrosia
 194 Prokne
 195 Eurykleia
 196 Philomela
 197 Arete
 198 Ampella
 199 Byblis
 200 Dynamene
 201 Penelope
 202 Chryseïs
 203 Pompeja
 204 Kallisto
 205 Martha
 206 Hersilia
 207 Hedda
 208 Lacrimosa
 209 Dido
 210 Isabella
 211 Isolda
 212 Medea
 213 Lilaea
 214 Aschera
 215 Oenone
 216 Kleopatra
 217 Eudora
 218 Bianca
 219 Thusnelda
 220 Stephania
 221 Eos
 222 Lucia
 223 Rosa
 224 Oceana
 225 Henrietta
 226 Weringia
 227 Philosophia
 228 Agathe
 229 Adelinda
 230 Athamantis
 231 Vindobona
 232 Russia
 233 Asterope
 234 Barbara
 235 Carolina
 236 Honoria
 237 Coelestina
 238 Hypatia
 239 Adrastea
 240 Vanadis
 241 Germania
 242 Kriemhild
 243 Ida
 244 Sita
 245 Vera
 246 Asporina
 247 Eukrate
 248 Lameia
 249 Ilse
 250 Bettina
 251 Sophia
 252 Clementina
 253 Mathilde
 254 Augusta
 255 Oppavia
 256 Walpurga
 257 Silesia
 258 Tyche
 259 Aletheia
 260 Huberta
 261 Prymno
 262 Valda
 263 Dresda
 264 Libussa
 265 Anna
 266 Aline
 267 Tirza
 268 Adorea
 269 Justitia
 270 Anahita
 271 Penthesilea
 272 Antonia
 273 Atropos
 274 Philagoria
 275 Sapientia
 276 Adelheid
 277 Elvira
 278 Paulina
 279 Thule
 280 Philia
 281 Lucretia
 282 Clorinde
 283 Emma
 284 Amalia
 285 Regina
 286 Iclea
 287 Nephthys
 288 Glauke
 289 Nenetta
 290 Bruna
 291 Alice
 292 Ludovica
 293 Brasilia
 294 Felicia
 295 Theresia
 296 Phaëtusa
 297 Caecilia
 298 Baptistina
 299 Thora
 300 Geraldina
 301 Bavaria
 302 Clarissa
 303 Josephina
 304 Olga
 305 Gordonia
 306 Unitas
 307 Nike
 308 Polyxo
 309 Fraternitas
 310 Margarita
 311 Claudia
 312 Pierretta
 313 Chaldaea
 314 Rosalia
 315 Constantia
 316 Goberta
 317 Roxane
 318 Magdalena
 319 Leona
 320 Katharina
 321 Florentina
 322 Phaeo
 323 Brucia
 324 Bamberga
 325 Heidelberga
 326 Tamara
 327 Columbia
 328 Gudrun
 329 Svea
 330 Adalberta
 331 Etheridgea
 332 Siri
 333 Badenia
 334 Chicago
 335 Roberta
 336 Lacadiera
 337 Devosa
 338 Budrosa
 339 Dorothea
 340 Eduarda
 341 California
 342 Endymion
 343 Ostara
 344 Desiderata
 345 Tercidina
 346 Hermentaria
 347 Pariana
 348 May
 349 Dembowska
 350 Ornamenta
 351 Yrsa
 352 Gisela
 353 Ruperto-Carola
 354 Eleonora
 355 Gabriella
 356 Liguria
 357 Ninina
 358 Apollonia
 359 Georgia
 360 Carlova
 361 Bononia
 362 Havnia
 363 Padua
 364 Isara
 365 Corduba
 366 Vincentina
 367 Amicitia
 368 Haidea
 369 Aëria
 370 Modestia
 371 Bohemia
 372 Palma
 373 Melusina
 374 Burgundia
 375 Ursula
 376 Geometria
 377 Campania
 378 Holmia
 379 Huenna
 380 Fiducia
 381 Myrrha
 382 Dodona
 383 Janina
 384 Burdigala
 385 Ilmatar
 386 Siegena
 387 Aquitania
 388 Charybdis
 389 Industria
 390 Alma
 391 Ingeborg
 392 Wilhelmina
 393 Lampetia
 394 Arduina
 395 Delia
 396 Aeolia
 397 Vienna
 398 Admete
 399 Persephone
 400 Ducrosa
 401 Ottilia
 402 Chloë
 403 Cyane
 404 Arsinoë
 405 Thia
 406 Erna
 407 Arachne
 408 Fama
 409 Aspasia
 410 Chloris
 411 Xanthe
 412 Elisabetha
 413 Edburga
 414 Liriope
 415 Palatia
 416 Vaticana
 417 Suevia
 418 Alemannia
 419 Aurelia
 420 Bertholda
 421 Zähringia
 422 Berolina
 423 Diotima
 424 Gratia
 425 Cornelia
 426 Hippo
 427 Galene
 428 Monachia
 429 Lotis
 430 Hybris
 431 Nephele
 432 Pythia
 433 Eros
 434 Hungaria
 435 Ella
 436 Patricia
 437 Rhodia
 438 Zeuxo
 439 Ohio
 440 Theodora
 441 Bathilde
 442 Eichsfeldia
 443 Photographica
 444 Gyptis
 445 Edna
 446 Aeternitas
 447 Valentine
 448 Natalie
 449 Hamburga
 450 Brigitta
 451 Patientia
 452 Hamiltonia
 453 Tea
 454 Mathesis
 455 Bruchsalia
 456 Abnoba
 457 Alleghenia
 458 Hercynia
 459 Signe
 460 Scania
 461 Saskia
 462 Eriphyla
 463 Lola
 464 Megaira
 465 Alekto
 466 Tisiphone
 467 Laura
 468 Lina
 469 Argentina
 470 Kilia
 471 Papagena
 472 Roma
 473 Nolli
 474 Prudentia
 475 Ocllo
 476 Hedwig
 477 Italia
 478 Tergeste
 479 Caprera
 480 Hansa
 481 Emita
 482 Petrina
 483 Seppina
 484 Pittsburghia
 485 Genua
 486 Cremona
 487 Venetia
 488 Kreusa
 489 Comacina
 490 Veritas
 491 Carina
 492 Gismonda
 493 Griseldis
 494 Virtus
 495 Eulalia
 496 Gryphia
 497 Iva
 498 Tokio
 499 Venusia
 500 Selinur
 501 Urhixidur
 502 Sigune
 503 Evelyn
 504 Cora
 505 Cava
 506 Marion
 507 Laodica
 508 Princetonia
 509 Iolanda
 510 Mabella
 511 Davida
 512 Taurinensis
 513 Centesima
 514 Armida
 515 Athalia
 516 Amherstia
 517 Edith
 518 Halawe
 519 Sylvania
 520 Franziska
 521 Brixia
 522 Helga
 523 Ada
 524 Fidelio
 525 Adelaide
 526 Jena
 527 Euryanthe
 528 Rezia
 529 Preziosa
 530 Turandot
 531 Zerlina
 532 Herculina
 533 Sara
 534 Nassovia
 535 Montague
 536 Merapi
 537 Pauly
 538 Friederike
 539 Pamina
 540 Rosamunde
 541 Deborah
 542 Susanna
 543 Charlotte
 544 Jetta
 545 Messalina
 546 Herodias
 547 Praxedis
 548 Kressida
 549 Jessonda
 550 Senta
 551 Ortrud
 552 Sigelinde
 553 Kundry
 554 Peraga
 555 Norma
 556 Phyllis
 557 Violetta
 558 Carmen
 559 Nanon
 560 Delila
 561 Ingwelde
 562 Salome
 563 Suleika
 564 Dudu
 565 Marbachia
 566 Stereoskopia
 567 Eleutheria
 568 Cheruskia
 569 Misa
 570 Kythera
 571 Dulcinea
 572 Rebekka
 573 Recha
 574 Reginhild
 575 Renate
 576 Emanuela
 577 Rhea
 578 Happelia
 579 Sidonia
 580 Selene
 581 Tauntonia
 582 Olympia
 583 Klotilde
 584 Semiramis
 585 Bilkis
 586 Thekla
 587 Hypsipyle
 588 Achilles
 589 Croatia
 590 Tomyris
 591 Irmgard
 592 Bathseba
 593 Titania
 594 Mireille
 595 Polyxena
 596 Scheila
 597 Bandusia
 598 Octavia
 599 Luisa
 600 Musa
 601 Nerthus
 602 Marianna
 603 Timandra
 604 Tekmessa
 605 Juvisia
 606 Brangäne
 607 Jenny
 608 Adolfine
 609 Fulvia
 610 Valeska
 611 Valeria
 612 Veronika
 613 Ginevra
 614 Pia
 615 Roswitha
 616 Elly
 617 Patroclus
 618 Elfriede
 619 Triberga
 620 Drakonia
 621 Werdandi
 622 Esther
 623 Chimaera
 624 Hektor
 625 Xenia
 626 Notburga
 627 Charis
 628 Christine
 629 Bernardina
 630 Euphemia
 631 Philippina
 632 Pyrrha
 633 Zelima
 634 Ute
 635 Vundtia
 636 Erika
 637 Chrysothemis
 638 Moira
 639 Latona
 640 Brambilla
 641 Agnes
 642 Clara
 643 Scheherezade
 644 Cosima
 645 Agrippina
 646 Kastalia
 647 Adelgunde
 648 Pippa
 649 Josefa
 650 Amalasuntha
 651 Antikleia
 652 Jubilatrix
 653 Berenike
 654 Zelinda
 655 Briseïs
 656 Beagle
 657 Gunlöd
 658 Asteria
 659 Nestor
 660 Crescentia
 661 Cloelia
 662 Newtonia
 663 Gerlinde
 664 Judith
 665 Sabine
 666 Desdemona
 667 Denise
 668 Dora
 669 Kypria
 670 Ottegebe
 671 Carnegia
 672 Astarte
 673 Edda
 674 Rachele
 675 Ludmilla
 676 Melitta
 677 Aaltje
 678 Fredegundis
 679 Pax
 680 Genoveva
 681 Gorgo
 682 Hagar
 683 Lanzia
 684 Hildburg
 685 Hermia
 686 Gersuind
 687 Tinette
 688 Melanie
 689 Zita
 690 Wratislavia
 691 Lehigh
 692 Hippodamia
 693 Zerbinetta
 694 Ekard
 695 Bella
 696 Leonora
 697 Galilea
 698 Ernestina
 699 Hela
 700 Auravictrix
 701 Oriola
 702 Alauda
 703 Noëmi
 704 Interamnia
 705 Erminia
 706 Hirundo
 707 Steina
 708 Raphaela
 709 Fringilla
 710 Gertrud
 711 Marmulla
 712 Boliviana
 713 Luscinia
 714 Ulula
 715 Transvaalia
 716 Berkeley
 717 Wisibada
 718 Erida
 719 Albert
 720 Bohlinia
 721 Tabora
 722 Frieda
 723 Hammonia
 724 Hapag
 725 Amanda
 726 Joëlla
 727 Nipponia
 728 Leonisis
 729 Watsonia
 730 Athanasia
 731 Sorga
 732 Tjilaki
 733 Mocia
 734 Benda
 735 Marghanna
 736 Harvard
 737 Arequipa
 738 Alagasta
 739 Mandeville
 740 Cantabia
 741 Botolphia
 742 Edisona
 743 Eugenisis
 744 Aguntina
 745 Mauritia
 746 Marlu
 747 Winchester
 748 Simeïsa
 749 Malzovia
 750 Oskar
 751 Faïna
 752 Sulamitis
 753 Tiflis
 754 Malabar
 755 Quintilla
 756 Lilliana
 757 Portlandia
 758 Mancunia
 759 Vinifera
 760 Massinga
 761 Brendelia
 762 Pulcova
 763 Cupido
 764 Gedania
 765 Mattiaca
 766 Moguntia
 767 Bondia
 768 Struveana
 769 Tatjana
 770 Bali
 771 Libera
 772 Tanete
 773 Irmintraud
 774 Armor
 775 Lumière
 776 Berbericia
 777 Gutemberga
 778 Theobalda
 779 Nina
 780 Armenia
 781 Kartvelia
 782 Montefiore
 783 Nora
 784 Pickeringia
 785 Zwetana
 786 Bredichina
 787 Moskva
 788 Hohensteina
 789 Lena
 790 Pretoria
 791 Ani
 792 Metcalfia
 793 Arizona
 794 Irenaea
 795 Fini
 796 Sarita
 797 Montana
 798 Ruth
 799 Gudula
 800 Kressmannia
 801 Helwerthia
 802 Epyaxa
 803 Picka
 804 Hispania
 805 Hormuthia
 806 Gyldénia
 807 Ceraskia
 808 Merxia
 809 Lundia
 810 Atossa
 811 Nauheima
 812 Adele
 813 Baumeia
 814 Tauris
 815 Coppelia
 816 Juliana
 817 Annika
 818 Kapteynia
 819 Barnardiana
 820 Adriana
 821 Fanny
 822 Lalage
 823 Sisigambis
 824 Anastasia
 825 Tanina
 826 Henrika
 827 Wolfiana
 828 Lindemannia
 829 Academia
 830 Petropolitana
 831 Stateira
 832 Karin
 833 Monica
 834 Burnhamia
 835 Olivia
 836 Jole
 837 Schwarzschilda
 838 Seraphina
 839 Valborg
 840 Zenobia
 841 Arabella
 842 Kerstin
 843 Nicolaia
 844 Leontina
 845 Naëma
 846 Lipperta
 847 Agnia
 848 Inna
 849 Ara
 850 Altona
 851 Zeissia
 852 Wladilena
 853 Nansenia
 854 Frostia
 855 Newcombia
 856 Backlunda
 857 Glasenappia
 858 El Djezaïr
 859 Bouzaréah
 860 Ursina
 861 Aïda
 862 Franzia
 863 Benkoela
 864 Aase
 865 Zubaida
 866 Fatme
 867 Kovacia
 868 Lova
 869 Mellena
 870 Manto
 871 Amneris
 872 Holda
 873 Mechthild
 874 Rotraut
 875 Nymphe
 876 Scott
 877 Walküre
 878 Mildred
 879 Ricarda
 880 Herba
 881 Athene
 882 Swetlana
 883 Matterania
 884 Priamus
 885 Ulrike
 886 Washingtonia
 887 Alinda
 888 Parysatis
 889 Erynia
 890 Waltraut
 891 Gunhild
 892 Seeligeria
 893 Leopoldina
 894 Erda
 895 Helio
 896 Sphinx
 897 Lysistrata
 898 Hildegard
 899 Jokaste
 900 Rosalinde
 901 Brunsia
 902 Probitas
 903 Nealley
 904 Rockefellia
 905 Universitas
 906 Repsolda
 907 Rhoda
 908 Buda
 909 Ulla
 910 Anneliese
 911 Agamemnon
 912 Maritima
 913 Otila
 914 Palisana
 915 Cosette
 916 America
 917 Lyka
 918 Itha
 919 Ilsebill
 920 Rogeria
 921 Jovita
 922 Schlutia
 923 Herluga
 924 Toni
 925 Alphonsina
 926 Imhilde
 927 Ratisbona
 928 Hildrun
 929 Algunde
 930 Westphalia
 931 Whittemora
 932 Hooveria
 933 Susi
 934 Thüringia
 935 Clivia
 936 Kunigunde
 937 Bethgea
 938 Chlosinde
 939 Isberga
 940 Kordula
 941 Murray
 942 Romilda
 943 Begonia
 944 Hidalgo
 945 Barcelona
 946 Poësia
 947 Monterosa
 948 Jucunda
 949 Hel
 950 Ahrensa
 951 Gaspra
 952 Caia
 953 Painleva
 954 Li
 955 Alstede
 956 Elisa
 957 Camelia
 958 Asplinda
 959 Arne
 960 Birgit
 961 Gunnie
 962 Aslög
 963 Iduberga
 964 Subamara
 965 Angelica
 966 Muschi
 967 Helionape
 968 Petunia
 969 Leocadia
 970 Primula
 971 Alsatia
 972 Cohnia
 973 Aralia
 974 Lioba
 975 Perseverantia
 976 Benjamina
 977 Philippa
 978 Aidamina
 979 Ilsewa
 980 Anacostia
 981 Martina
 982 Franklina
 983 Gunila
 984 Gretia
 985 Rosina
 986 Amelia
 987 Wallia
 988 Appella
 989 Schwassmannia
 990 Yerkes
 991 McDonalda
 992 Swasey
 993 Moultona
 994 Otthild
 995 Sternberga
 996 Hilaritas
 997 Priska
 998 Bodea
 999 Zachia

See also 
 List of minor planet discoverers
 List of observatory codes

References

External links 
 Discovery Circumstances: Numbered Minor Planets, Minor Planet Center

Lists of minor planets by name